Zip was a Canadian discount airline headquartered in Hangar 101 at Calgary International Airport, Calgary, Alberta. It was launched by Air Canada as a no-frills subsidiary in September 2002. It operated a fleet of 12 Boeing 737 aircraft, each painted in a bright, neon colour (blue, fuchsia, green, and orange) with a single class of service.  The subsidiary was headed by former WestJet CEO, Steve Smith.

As a direct competition to Canada's leading low-cost carrier WestJet, Zip flew mostly between the western cities of Abbotsford, Calgary, Edmonton, Vancouver, Saskatoon, Regina and Winnipeg.

Zip ceased operations in September 2004 when Air Canada resumed a full schedule on its western routes.

Branding

Zip was known for branding its advertising with 3 character words. Among them, "yuk" was printed on the air sickness bags, "bag" was printed on the personal baggage tags, and "yum" was printed on the napkins distributed with beverages on board. Large print advertisements were erected in many cities, which simply said "fly" and the company's website below, 4321zip.com. Today, the website redirects to the official Air Canada website, along with other subsidiaries' websites.

Destinations

As of August 2004, Zip served the following destinations:

Fleet

Zip operated a fleet consisting entirely of Boeing 737-200 aircraft, all obtained from the existing Air Canada fleet.

Livery
Zip's aircraft were painted in bright, neon colours on the fuselage, tail, and engines. Specifically, the colours blue, fuchsia, green, and orange were painted.

The fuselage was painted in the aircraft's colour, except for a white silhouette of a bee, with white dots trailing it. These dots extended to the back to the fuselage, leading to the tail of the aircraft, where Zip's logo was painted. On the engines, Zip's website, 4321zip.com was printed in white.

Towards the end of the airline, some aircraft were painted in a different livery. The main fuselage was white, with a small bee on the side of the nose. The 4321zip.com website was printed on the fuselage as well. The tail sectioned retained the same logo but with striping on the back. These were also in the original colors of blue, fuchsia, orange and green.

One aircraft was painted in a special Christmas livery with a red nose, a smile under the nose, and a large red & white striped scarf stretching down the fuselage.

See also
 List of defunct airlines of Canada
 Air Canada
 Air Canada Tango

References

External links

 Zip (Archive)
 CBC News article, Zip

Defunct airlines of Canada
Air Canada
Airlines established in 2002
Airlines disestablished in 2004
2002 establishments in Alberta
2004 disestablishments in Alberta
Defunct low-cost airlines
Former Star Alliance affiliate members